All American: Homecoming is an American sports drama television series created by Nkechi Okoro Carroll that  premiered on The CW on February 21, 2022. It is a spin-off of All American. In May 2022, the series was renewed for a second season which premiered on October 10, 2022.

Plot

In this spin-off from All American, Simone Hicks leaves behind her boyfriend Jordan in Los Angeles and attends Bringston University, a historically black college in Atlanta, Georgia where she decides to pursue her dreams of being a pro tennis player. Also attending the school is Damon Sims, a fellow freshman who is navigating the college scene to pursue his dream of playing baseball for the university after rejecting an MLB draft to continue to play baseball for Bringston under the guidance of his coach, Marcus Turner. Also included is Amara Patterson, Simone's aunt, who teaches journalism at Bringston.

Cast and characters

Main

 Geffri Maya as Simone Hicks
 Peyton Alex Smith as Damon Sims, a nationally ranked high school baseball prodigy
 Kelly Jenrette as Amara Patterson, a successful journalist-turned-journalism professor and Simone's maternal aunt
 Cory Hardrict as Coach Marcus Turner, tough and blunt baseball coach who played at Bringston University and was drafted into pro ball, only to have an injury sideline his career. 
 Sylvester Powell as Jessie "J.R." Raymond, Jr., an Atlanta native and varsity baseball player
 Camille Hyde as Thea Mays, a queen-bee sophomore and tennis prodigy that gives off slight mean girl tendencies
 Mitchell Edwards as Cam Watkins, Spencer James' Crenshaw football nemesis who is now a student at Bringston 
 Netta Walker as Keisha McCalla, the life of the party and the unofficial mayor of Bringston University; her father is the president of the university
 Rhoyle Ivy King as Nathaniel Hardin (season 2; recurring season 1), Simone and Keisha's non-binary, gender-fluid friend

Recurring

 John Marshall Jones as Leonard Shaw
 Tamberla Perry as Keena Sims, Damon's always on momager who wants her future MLB star son back on track after choosing Bringston University
 Leonard Roberts as President Zeke Allen	
 Derek Rivera as Santiago Reyes
 Sabrina Revelle as Coach Elaine Loni, Bringston University's tennis coach
 Robert Bailey Jr. as Ralph Wells
 Iyana Halley as Wilinda
 Joe Holt as Jessie, J.R.'s father, Damon's biological father & current head baseball coach at Bringston University
 Crystal Lee Brown as Celine
 Shelli Boone as Tina Hicks
 Heather Lynn Harris as Gabrielle
 Renee Harrison as Aqueelah
 Martin Bobb-Semple as Orlando 'Lando' Johnson
 Jamad Mays as Rome (season 2)
 Diahnna Nicole Baxter as Dr. Pace (season 2)
 Taylor Polidore as Tootie (season 2)
 Blake Brewer as Nico Logan (season 2)

Special guest stars
 Michael Evans Behling as Jordan Baker
 Daniel Ezra as Spencer James (season 2)
 Reggie Bush as himself (season 2)

Notable guest stars
 Greta Onieogou as Layla Keating (season 2)

Episodes

Series overview

Backdoor pilot (2021)

Season 1 (2022)

Season 2 (2022–23)

Production

Development
On December 18, 2020, it was announced that The CW is in early development of a backdoor pilot for a spin-off of Geffri Maya's character Simone Hicks reprising her role from All American. On February 1, 2021, The CW gave the spin-off a pilot order and titled it as All American: Homecoming. On May 24, 2021, All American: Homecoming was picked up to series. The series is created by Nkechi Okoro Carroll who is expected to executive produce alongside Greg Berlanti, Sarah Schechter, David Madden, and Robbie Rogers. The backdoor pilot is written by Carroll and directed by Michael Schultz. The production companies involved with the series are Berlanti Productions and Warner Bros. Television. The backdoor pilot aired on July 5, 2021, as part of the third season of All American. The series premiered on February 21, 2022. On May 12, 2022, The CW renewed the series for a second season which premiered on October 10, 2022.

Casting
On March 29, 2021, it was reported that Peyton Alex Smith, Cory Hardrict, Kelly Jenrette, Sylverser Powell, Netta Walker, and Camille Hyde were cast to star. On December 16, 2021, it was announced that Mitchell Edwards who recurs as Cam Watkins on All American is set to reprise his role on this series a series regular. On January 28, 2022, it was reported that Tamberla Perry joined the cast in a recurring role. On June 21, 2022, Rhoyle Ivy King was promoted as a series regular for the second season.

Home media 
After being scheduled to release on HBO Max in June 2022, the series was pulled from the schedule and added to Netflix on July 12, 2022, in the United States.

Reception

Season 1

Season 2

References

External links

 Production website

2020s American black television series
2020s American college television series
2020s American drama television series
2022 American television series debuts
American sports television series
Baseball television series
The CW original programming
Television series by CBS Studios
Television series by Warner Bros. Television Studios
Television shows set in Atlanta
Television shows set in Georgia (U.S. state)
English-language television shows
American television spin-offs
College baseball on television in the United States